Taylor Lynn Hearn (born August 30, 1994) is an American professional baseball pitcher for the Texas Rangers of Major League Baseball (MLB). He made his MLB debut in 2019.

Amateur career
Hearn attended Royse City High School in Royse City, Texas. He was drafted after his senior year by the Pittsburgh Pirates in the 22nd round of the 2012 Major League Baseball draft. Rather than sign, he chose to attend San Jacinto College to play college baseball. He was then drafted by the Cincinnati Reds in the 36th round of the 2013 MLB draft, but did not sign. After a second season at San Jacinto, he was drafted by the Minnesota Twins in 25th round of the 2014 MLB draft. He chose to transfer to Oklahoma Baptist University instead of signing. After one year at Oklahoma Baptist, he was drafted by the Washington Nationals in the fifth round of the 2015 MLB draft and signed.

Professional career

Washington Nationals
Hearn spent the 2015 season with both the rookie GCL Nationals and the Class A Short Season Auburn Doubledays, posting a 1–5 record and a 3.56 earned run average (ERA) in 12 games (11 starts). He began 2016 with the GCL Nationals and was later promoted to the Class A Hagerstown Suns.

Pittsburgh Pirates

On July 30, 2016, the Nationals traded Hearn along with Felipe Vázquez to the Pittsburgh Pirates for Mark Melancon. He played the rest of the season with their Class A West Virginia Power. In 18 games (7 starts) pitched between the Nationals, Doubledays, and Suns, he had a 2–1 record with a 2.44 ERA and 75 strikeouts in 51.2 innings. Hearn played the entire 2017 season with the Class A-Advanced Bradenton Marauders, accumulating a 4–6 record and a 4.12 ERA in 19 games (18 starts). He began 2018 with the Double-A Altoona Curve and was selected for the Eastern League All-Star team.

Texas Rangers
Hearn was traded to the Texas Rangers, along with Sherten Apostel, in exchange for Keone Kela on July 30, 2018. He finished the year with the Double-A Frisco RoughRiders. In 24 starts between both clubs, he went 4–8 with a 3.49 ERA. The Rangers added him to their 40-man roster after the season. In 2019, Hearn was optioned to the Triple-A Nashville Sounds to open the season. In 4 games for Nashville, Hearn went 1–3 with a 4.05 ERA and 26 strikeouts over 20 innings.

Hearn was promoted to the Rangers on April 25, 2019, to make his major league debut that night against the Seattle Mariners. He pitched just  of an inning, allowing five runs (four earned). On April 26, he was placed on the injured list with inflammation in his left elbow. Hearn did not return to game action in 2019, as he suffered a fracture in his elbow during rehabilitation in June. In 2020, Hearn went 0–0 with a 3.63 ERA and 23 strikeouts over  innings for Texas. With Texas in 2021, Hearn went 6–6 with a 4.66 ERA and 92 strikeouts over  innings.

Hearn went 6–8 with a 5.13 ERA and 97 strikeouts over 100 innings in 2022. He bounced between the rotation and bullpen that season, as well as being demoted to the Round Rock Express of the Triple-A Pacific Coast League for three games.

On January 13, 2023, Hearn agreed to a one-year, $1.4625 million contract with the Rangers, avoiding salary arbitration.

Personal life
Hearn is a Christian. Hearn's grandfather Cleo, father Robby, and three uncles are all former rodeo cowboys. Hearn participated in rodeos growing up from the age 4 through age 17.

Hearn's high school number 21 was retired by Royse City High School in 2017.

References

External links

1994 births
Living people
African-American baseball players
People from Royse City, Texas
Baseball players from Texas
Major League Baseball pitchers
Texas Rangers players
San Jacinto Central Ravens baseball players
Oklahoma Baptist Bison baseball players
Gulf Coast Nationals players
Auburn Doubledays players
Hagerstown Suns players
Gulf Coast Pirates players
Bradenton Marauders players
West Virginia Power players
Glendale Desert Dogs players
Altoona Curve players
Frisco RoughRiders players
Nashville Sounds players
21st-century African-American sportspeople